Saruq District is a district (bakhsh) in Arak County, Markazi Province, Iran. At the 2006 census, its population was 8,410, in 2,234 families.  The District has one city: Saruq. The District has one rural district (dehestan): Saruq Rural District.

References 

Arak County
Districts of Markazi Province